Tsunehisa Kimura (木村恒久, Kimura Tsunehisa; 1928–2008) was a Japanese artist influential in graphic design.

Style 
Kimura's photomontage imagine a surreal world of ongoing apocalypse and often showcase the encroachment of nature and natural phenomenon on man-made structures and the urban built environment.

His most famous ‘Visual Scandals’ series was published in book form by Parco, Tokyo in 1979.

In popular culture 
Kimura provided the cover artwork to Midnight Oil's 1984 album Red Sails in the Sunset. Additionally, altered versions of one of his works appear as cover art for Climax Blues Band's 1980 album Flying the Flag and Cut Copy's 2011 album Zonoscope. Cut Copy would eventually go on to win the Artisan Award for Best Cover Art at the ARIA Music Awards of 2011.

Design commentators have drawn attention to similarities between Kimura's work and the CGI envisioning of the Tom Cruise film Oblivion, particularly in the design of promotional material.

References

External links
Tsunehisa Kimura - Scanning The Digital Apocalypse

1928 births
2008 deaths
Japanese artists
Modern artists